The 2004 congressional elections in Massachusetts was held on November 2, 2004, to determine who would represent the state of Massachusetts in the United States House of Representatives. Massachusetts had ten seats in the House, apportioned according to the 2000 United States Census. Representatives are elected for two-year terms; those elected were served in the 109th Congress from January 3, 2005 until January 3, 2007.

Overview

District 1

Incumbent Democratic Congressman John Olver ran for an eighth term in this staunchly Democratic  district rooted in western Massachusetts. Facing no opponents in the general election, Olver was overwhelmingly re-elected to another term.

Steven Adam ran as a write-in for the Republican nomination, but did not receive enough votes to make the general election ballot.

District 2

This south-central Massachusetts-based district has a strong tendency to elect Democratic candidates, and this year proved no different. When incumbent Democratic Congressman Richard Neal ran for a ninth term, he faced no opposition and coasted to re-election.

District 3

Though incumbent Democratic Congressman Jim McGovern faced a challenge from Republican candidate Ronald Crews. This historically liberal district, which stretches from the western suburbs of Boston to the Massachusetts-Rhode Island border, has sent Congressman McGovern back to Congress with overwhelming margins of victory. This year proved to be no different, and McGovern crushed Crews to win a fifth term.

District 4

Congressman Barney Frank, a Democrat, has represented this strongly liberal district, which extends from Quincy to the South Coast, since he was initially elected in 1980. In 2004, Congressman Frank faced a challenge from independent candidate Chuck Morse, whom he was able to defeat by a wide margin.

District 5

This liberal district rooted in the northern and eastern suburbs of Boston has been represented by Congressman Marty Meehan since he was first elected in 1992. This year, Congressman Meehan faced a challenge from Republican Thomas Tierney, but the Congressman won a seventh term.

District 6

This district, which covers some of the northern suburbs of Boston and the far northeastern portion of the commonwealth, has been represented by Democratic Congressman John Tierney for eight years. In his quest for a fifth term, Tierney was opposed by Republican Stephen O'Malley, but he was re-elected in a landslide.

District 7

Democratic Congressman Ed Markey, the longest serving member of the Massachusetts House members, has continually been re-elected with large margins in this staunchly liberal district based in the northern and eastern suburbs of Boston. This year, Congressman Markey faced off against Republican Kenneth Chase, whom he crushed.

District 8

This congressional district, based in Boston and some of its southern suburbs, is the smallest district in Massachusetts and has been represented by Democratic Congressman Mike Capuano since 1999. Seeking a fourth term, Capuano faced no opposition and easily won the election.

District 9

Democratic Congressman Steven Lynch, a moderate Democrat, has represented this district rooted in south Boston since he was first elected in 2001 in a special election to replace the late Congressman Joe Moakley. With a solidly liberal constituency, Congressman Lynch encountered no opposition in his bid for a third term.

District 10

Opposed by Republican Michael Jones, incumbent Democratic Congressman Bill Delahunt sought a fifth term in this district based in the South Shore, Cape Cod and the Islands. Though more moderate than the other districts in the commonwealth, the 10th district sent Congressman Delahunt back to Washington.

References

House of Representatives
2004
Massachusetts